

Friedrich Erich Walther (5 August 1903 – 26 December 1948) was a German paratroop general during World War II. He was a recipient of the Knight's Cross of the Iron Cross with Oak Leaves and Swords of Nazi Germany. Walther commanded the Hermann Göring 2nd Parachute Panzer-Grenadier Division in East Prussia. He was promoted to Generalmajor on 30 January 1945. Walther surrendered to the Red Army on 8 May 1945. He died at Soviet Special Camp 2 on 26 December 1948.

World War II 
During World War II Walther fought over much of Europe as a paratroop officer.

In April 1940 he participated in the Norwegian Campaign as a captain.  In May 1940 Walther participated in the airborne attack in the Netherlands and was promoted to the rank of major. In May 1941 he participated in an airborne attack on the island of Crete. Since September 1941 Walther fought on the eastern front, fighting near Leningrad. In January 1942 he was promoted to a lieutenant colonel. In July 1943 Walther fought on the island of Sicily, later in mainland Italy.  In September 1944 Walther became battlefield commander, fighting in the Arnhem area. In the end of September 1944 he became Commander in the East Front, fighting in East Prussia. In January 1945 until he became a Soviet Prisoner of war on May 8 the same year, Walther was ranked Generalmajor.

Awards
 Iron Cross (1939) 2nd Class (18 April 1940) & 1st Class (26 April 1940)
 German Cross in Gold on 31 March 1942 as Major in the I./Fallschirmjäger-Regiment 1
 Knight's Cross of the Iron Cross with Oak Leaves and Swords
 Knight's Cross on 24 May 1940 as Major and commander of the I./Fallschirmjäger-Regiment 1
 411th Oak Leaves on 2 March 1944 as Oberst and commander of Fallschirmjäger-Regiment 4
 131st Swords on 1 February 1945 as Oberst and leader of Fallschirm-Panzergrenadier-Division 2 "Hermann Göring"

References

Citations

Bibliography

 
 
 

1903 births
1947 deaths
Luftwaffe World War II generals
Fallschirmjäger of World War II
Military personnel from Brandenburg
People from the Province of Saxony
Recipients of the Gold German Cross
Recipients of the Knight's Cross of the Iron Cross with Oak Leaves and Swords
German prisoners of war in World War II held by the Soviet Union
German people who died in Soviet detention
Major generals of the Luftwaffe